is a railway station on the AbukumaExpress in the city of Kakuda, Miyagi Prefecture, Japan.

Lines

Station layout
Minami-Kakuda Station has one side platform serving a single bi-directional. There is no station building, but only a shelter built on the platform. The station is unattended.

Adjacent stations

History
Minami-Kakuda Station opened with the start of operations of the Abukuma Express on July 1, 1986.

Surrounding area
The station is located south of Kakuda Station and southwest of Kakuda City Hall. Separated from the city center by a ridge, the station commands a rural view of rice fields.
 site of Kakuda Castle

See also
 List of Railway Stations in Japan

External links

  

Railway stations in Miyagi Prefecture
Abukuma Express Line
Railway stations in Japan opened in 1986
Railway stations in Japan opened in 1968
Kakuda, Miyagi